Alexander or Alex Müller may refer to:
 K. Alex Müller (1927–2023), Swiss physicist and Nobel laureate
 Alex Müller (racing driver) (born 1979), German racing driver
 Alexander Müller (skeleton racer), Austrian skeleton racer
 Alexander Müller (composer) (1808–1863), German pianist, teacher, conductor and composer
 Alexander Müller (politician) (born 1969), German politician
Alexander Müller (chemist) (1828–1906), German agricultural chemist